Bankhai United Football Club (Thai บ้านค่าย ยูไนเต็ด), is a Thai football club based in Ban Khai District, Rayong Province, Thailand. The club is currently playing in the Thai League 3 Eastern region.

History

Khǒr Royal Cup
Bankhai United was founded in 2012, they are the local football team of Ban Khai District, Rayong Province. In January 2012 they purchased the playing license of Khǒr Royal Cup from Bantungked School F.C.

On 9 January 2012 they played first ever match with Sports Association of Rayong Province F.C. in Khǒr Royal Cup 2011 season and win 4–1. In their first season they qualified to the semi-final before defeated to Krung Thonburi F.C. 3–2.

In Khǒr Royal Cup 2012 season they were in round of 16 and defeated to Rayong Province in penalty shoot-out. In 2013 season they qualified to the semi-final again and draw with Rajapruek University F.C. 2–2 but defeated in penalty shoot -out.

In 2014 they defeated in round of 16 to Army Welfare Department F.C. 1–2 and fall in the first round of 2015 season

Thai Football Amateur Tournament

Team records

Matches 
 First Official Match 
 4–1 win v Sports Association of Rayong Province, 9 January 2012 in Khǒr Royal Cup 
 First Football League Match
 2–0 win v Saimitr Kabin United , 16 February 2017 in Thai League 4
 Biggest Win
 Biggest Loss 
 Biggest League Win
 2–0 win v Saimitr Kabin United , 16 February 2017 in Thai League 4

Player records 
 First player to score a goal
 Withan Kajorn-Gridikul : 4–1 win v Sports Association of Rayong Province , 9 January 2012 in Khǒr Royal Cup
 First player to score a league goal
 Most goals scored in one game
 3 by Panukorn Prapa : 9–1 win v Takhian Tia, 18 December 2016 in Thai Football Amateur Tournament
 Most goals scored in one football league game

Stadium and locations

Record

Players

Current squad

Honours

Domestic leagues
 Thai League 4 Eastern Region
 Winners (2): 2018, 2019
 Football Division 3
 Winners (1): 2016

References

 104 ทีมร่วมชิงชัย! แบโผผลจับสลาก ดิวิชั่น 3 ฤดูกาล 2016

External links
 Facebookpage

Association football clubs established in 2012
Football clubs in Thailand
Rayong province
2012 establishments in Thailand